Barbara Wilson may refer to:

 Barbara Wilson (astronomer) (1947–2019), American amateur astronomer and director of the George Observatory
 Barbara Wilson (author), author of the Lambda Award winning novel on which the 2001 film Gaudi Afternoon was based
 Barbara Wilson (Australian sprinter) (born 1952), Australian sprinter
 Barbara Wilson (Batgirl), fictional movie character in Batman and Robin
 Barbara Wilson (psychologist) (born 1941), British neuropsychologist
 Barbara Wilson (singer),  Panamanian jazz singer in the 1940's